Avneet Kaur (born 13 October 2001) is an Indian actress, dancer and model. She is known for portraying Meera in Mardaani, Charumati in Chandra Nandini, and Princess Yasmine in Aladdin – Naam Toh Suna Hoga.

Career 
Kaur began her career in 2010 with Zee TV's dance show Dance India Dance Li'l Masters. She was eliminated before the semi-finals. She then participated in Dance Ke Superstars, where she joined the team of "Dance Challengers".

Kaur made her acting debut in 2012 with Life OK's Meri Maa where she played Jhilmil. Then, she acted in SAB TV's Tedhe Hain Par Tere Mere Hain. In 2012, Kaur participated in Colors TV's celebrity dance reality show Jhalak Dikhhla Jaa, where she was a contestant with Darsheel Safary. She was the youngest contestant to appear on this show.

Later, Kaur was featured in Life OK's Savitri, where she played Rajkumari Damyanti. In August 2013, Kaur played Pakhi in Zee TV's Ek Mutthi Aasmaan. She also appeared in ZeeQ's news bulletin titled The Weekly Rap.

Kaur started her film career in 2014 with Pradeep Sarkar's Mardaani.

In September 2014, she played Khushi in Sony Pal's Hamari Sister Didi. In 2016, she starred in short film titled Dost - Safi Mother - Daughter released on YouTube under the banner of Jigsaw Pictures. In 2017, Kaur played Queen Charumati in Chandra Nandini. From 2018 to 2020, she starred as Princess Yasmine in SAB TV's Aladdin – Naam Toh Suna Hoga, and then left the show in mid-2020 due to health issues.

As of 2023, Kaur is set to make her Bollywood lead debut in Kangana Ranaut's Tiku Weds Sheru, opposite Nawazuddin Siddiqui.

Personal life 

Kaur was born into a Sikh family to Sonia Nandra and Amandeep Singh Nandra on 13 October 2001 in Jalandhar, Punjab and later moved to Mumbai. She began her performing career in 2010 at the age of 8. As of 2021, Kaur is pursuing a degree in commerce from a private college in Kandivali, Mumbai.

Filmography

Films

Television

Special appearances

Web series

Music videos

Awards and nominations

See also 
List of Indian film actresses
List of Indian television actresses
 List of Hindi television actresses

References

External links

 
 

Living people
2001 births
People from Amritsar
Actresses from Punjab, India
Actresses from Mumbai
Indian dancers
21st-century Indian actresses
Indian film actresses
Actresses in Hindi cinema
Indian television actresses
Actresses in Hindi television
Indian soap opera actresses
Indian television child actresses
Participants in Indian reality television series
Reality dancing competition contestants